Saul Arno Teukolsky (born August 2, 1947) is a theoretical astrophysicist and a professor of Physics and Astronomy at Caltech and Cornell University. His major research interests include general relativity, relativistic astrophysics, and computational astrophysics.

Biography
After matriculating from Selborne College (East London, South Africa) in 1964, Teukolsky received a Bachelor of Science in Honors Physics and Honors Applied Mathematics from the University of the Witwatersrand, South Africa in 1970. He went on to be a graduate student under Kip Thorne at Caltech where he received his Ph.D. in 1973. He joined Cornell University as an Assistant Professor of Physics and Astronomy in 1974 after serving as the Richard Chace Tolman Research Fellow for one year at Caltech. He was promoted to Associate Professor in 1977 and Full Professor in 1983.  In 1999 he was named the Hans A. Bethe professor of physics and astrophysics, a position which he still holds. In 2017  he was also appointed as Robinson Professor of Theoretical Astrophysics at Caltech.

Teukolsky is one of the pioneers of numerical relativity: the subject that deals with equations involving general relativity using supercomputers. He is a coauthor of the Numerical Recipes series of books on scientific computing. Today his research group works on numerical relativity calculations to predict signals from the LIGO and LISA experiments.

Awards

 Alfred P. Sloan Fellow, 1973
 John Simon Guggenheim Fellow, 1981
 Forefronts of Large-Scale Computing Award, 1990
 Fellow of the American Physical Society, 1994
 Fellow of the American Astronomical Society.
 Member of American Academy of Arts and Sciences, 1996
 Member of National Academy of Sciences, 2003
 Dirac Medal of the ICTP, 2021
 Einstein prize of APS (joint with Clifford Will), 2021.

References

External links 
 Astronomy Homepage at Cornell Univ.
 Physics Homepage at Cornell Univ. 

Living people
1947 births
21st-century American physicists
American relativity theorists
Cornell University faculty
Members of the United States National Academy of Sciences
20th-century South African physicists
Alumni of Selborne College